Giorgio Anselmi (5 April 1723 – 30 March 1797) was an Italian painter.

Born in Verona, he studied with Antonio Balestra and worked mainly in Veneto, Lombardy, Emilia and Trentino with frescoes and oil works. He painted the dome of Sant'Andrea and some rooms of Palazzo Te in Mantua.

He died in Lendinara, from a fall while painting the dome of the local cathedral.

References
 
Studi sopra la storia della pittura italiana dei secoli xiv e xv e della scuola pittorica. By Cesare Bernasconi

1723 births
1797 deaths
Painters from Verona
18th-century Italian painters
Italian male painters
Rococo painters
18th-century Italian people
Accidental deaths from falls
18th-century Italian male artists